Horacio San Martín (born February 15, 1982 in Formosa) is an Argentine rugby union footballer. He plays in the centre position. His test debut was against Wales at the Millennium Stadium in November 2009. In May 2010 San Martín was selected in a squad of over 40 players to represent Argentina in the two test Summer tour of Argentina.

See also
2009 End of year tours
Argentina Rugby Union

References

ESPN Scrum

External links
ESPN Scrum

1982 births
Living people
Argentine rugby union players
Argentina international rugby union players
Argentine people of Asturian descent
People from Formosa, Argentina
Argentina international rugby sevens players